The 1955 World Table Tennis Championships men's singles was the 22nd edition of the men's singles championship. 

Toshiaki Tanaka defeated Žarko Dolinar in the final, winning three sets to nil to secure the title.

Results

See also
List of World Table Tennis Championships medalists

References

-